An election was held in the Australian state of Queensland on 17 February 2001 to elect the 89 members of the state's Legislative Assembly. The result of the election was the return of the Labor Party (ALP) government of Premier Peter Beattie, with an increased majority. Labor won 66 seats, easily the most it has ever won in Queensland and one of Labor's best-ever results nationwide. There was a 10.07% swing towards Labor, while One Nation suffered a 13.98% swing against it, losing eight seats (five of which were held by the newly formed City Country Alliance after an internal split in December 1999).

The longstanding coalition between the Nationals and Liberals, led by Nationals leader (and former premier) Rob Borbidge recorded only a 2.39% swing against it.  However, its support in Brisbane all but vanished; it was reduced to only one seat in the capital.  Largely due to losses in Brisbane, the Coalition suffered an overall 17-seat loss. This included only three seats for the Liberals, easily the worst showing for the urban non-Labor party in Queensland since it adopted the Liberal banner in 1948. The 'Just Vote 1' strategy adopted by the Labor campaign (capitalising on Queensland's optional preferential voting system) was also considered to be effective in reducing preference flows between the Coalition parties, thereby dampening the combined strength of the conservative parties.

Key dates

Results

|}

Seats changing hands

Candidates listed in italics did not contest their seat at this election.

1Candidates Black, Dalgleish, Feldman, Paff and Prenzler were all elected as One Nation Party MLAs, but abandoned that party to form the City Country Alliance in December 1999.

2 Shaun Nelson was elected as a One Nation Party MLA in 1998, but left that party in February 1999 to sit as an independent.

3 Ken Turner was elected as a One Nation Party MLA in 1998, but left that party in 1999 to sit as an independent.

Post-election pendulum

Subsequent changes

After losing the election, Opposition Leader Rob Borbidge (Surfers Paradise) resigned his position as Leader of the Nationals and his seat.  In the resulting by-election, held on 5 May 2001, Surfers Paradise was won by Lex Bell, an independent former mayor.  Borbidge was replaced as Nationals leader by Mike Horan (Toowoomba South), who in turn was replaced by Lawrence Springborg (Southern Downs) in February 2003.
Dr David Watson (Moggill) resigned as Leader of the Liberal Party in favour of Bob Quinn (Robina) on 28 February 2001.
Ray Hopper (Darling Downs), after being elected as an Independent, joined the National Party in December 2001.
On 18 April 2002, Elisa Roberts (Gympie) resigned from the One Nation Party and sat as an Independent, reducing that party's total to two seats.
On 23 March 2003, John Kingston (Maryborough), a former member of One Nation now sitting as an independent, resigned his seat.  Chris Foley, another independent, won the by-election on 8 May.

References

See also
Candidates of the Queensland state election, 2001
Members of the Queensland Legislative Assembly, 1998–2001
Members of the Queensland Legislative Assembly, 2001–2004
Beattie Ministry

Elections in Queensland
2001 elections in Australia
2000s in Queensland
February 2001 events in Australia